Moritz Heinrich Romberg (11 November 1795 – 16 June 1873) was a German physician and neurologist, born in Meiningen, who published his classic textbook in sections between 1840 and 1846; Edward Henry Sieveking translated it into English in 1853. His nephew was Eduard Heinrich Henoch, who was known for describing Henoch–Schönlein purpura.

He described what is now universally recognised as "Romberg's sign" in his original account of tabes dorsalis (a disease caused by syphilis damaging the back of the spinal cord). He related early symptoms as: "The feet feel numbed in standing, walking or lying down, and the patient has the sensation as if they were covered in fur; the resistance of the ground is not felt..."

Romberg's sign he described as: "The gait begins to be insecure... he puts down his feet with greater force...The individual keeps his eyes on his feet to prevent his movements from becoming still more unsteady. If he is ordered to close his eyes while in the erect posture, he at once commences to totter and swing from side to side; the insecurity of his gait also exhibits itself more in the dark." Romberg had not observed this in other paralyses.

The unsteadiness with eyes closed (sensory ataxia), relates to loss of sense of position in the legs and feet that are normally compensated for by the patient who uses vision to provide that information. But when the eyes are closed or in the dark, the loss of sense of position causes unsteadiness and sometimes falls, as Romberg described.

He was one of a tiny number of truly innovative neurologists in Europe who in the 1820-50 period introduced order and clinical observation and deduction into what was then an elementary discipline. He is credited with having been "the first clinical neurologist".

According to Pearce, Romberg acquired much of the wisdom and attitudes prevailing in English medicine when in 1820 he translated into German, Andrew Marshall's (1742–1813) The Morbid Anatomy of the Brain and Charles Bell’s The Nervous System of the Human Body. He revolutionised European neurology, publishing his Lehrbuch der Nervenkrankheiten des Menschen: the first systematic textbook in neurology. Romberg’s contribution to neurology, and his establishing tabes dorsalis as a distinctive disease were of crucial importance. Romberg’s sign, once synonymous with tabes dorsalis, became recognised as common to all proprioceptive disorders of the legs. His several major clinical contributions included: a classic description of achondroplasia (on which he wrote his graduation thesis entitled "Congenital rickets" in 1817), progressive facial hemiatrophy, and an unmistakable description of the pupils in tertiary syphilis before E.J. Remak and Argyll Robertson.

See also
Parry–Romberg syndrome

References

External links
 - Jewish Encyclopedia
J.M.S. Pearce: Romberg and His Sign

1795 births
1873 deaths
18th-century German Jews
German neurologists
Jewish physicians
Physicians of the Charité